Stelis pilosa is a species of epiphytic orchid native to Costa Rica and Panama.

Description 
It is a small orchid with an epiphytic  habit, with thin ramicauls carrying a single leaf. It blooms with an inflorescence, 3 to 10 cm long, racemose, loosely with 6 to 8 flowers arising from a spathe at the base of the leaf. A  characteristic of this species is that the flowers are white.

Distribution 
It is found in Panama and Costa Rica in low mountain humid forests at elevations of 1200 to 1800 meters.

Taxonomy 
It was described by Alec M. Pridgeon & Mark Wayne Chase, in: Lindleyana 17: 100. in 2002.

References 

pilosa